Big Brother 2018 is the seventh season of the Big Brother Croatia and ninth season of Big Brother franchise overall to air on RTL. This season premiered on January 27, 2018 on RTL. Antonija Blaće hosting the main shows.

The prize for the winner this season is 371,000 kn.

Housemates
On Day 1, 18 housemates entered the house. Dubravka, Marijan, Matija and Nikola V entered the Secret House. On Day 4, Zebo entered the house. On Day 17, Anči entered the house. On Day 20, Lidija and Ljiljana entered the house. On Day 31, Jure entered the house. On Day 36, 6 more housemates entered the house. On Day 47 Petar entered the house. On Day 50 Ante entered the house.

Nominations Table
The first housemate in each box was nominated for two points, and the second housemate was nominated for one point.

Notes

: Aleksandar Neradin was removed from the house for violation of the contract.
: Because of the unsuccessful of guessing male housemates' secrets, all female housemates were nominated.
: Juraj, Nikita and Renata were banned from nomination as punishment for violated the rules.
: Because of the successful of guessing female housemates' secrets, all female housemates were nominated.
: Due to violating the rules, all the housemates except Anchy, Dubravka, Marijan, Matija and Nikola were nominated.
: Tomislav was nominated forever, while, Ana was automatically nominated by Big Brother due to aggressive behaviour.
: In this round, Anči, Lidija, Ljiljana, Marijan and Dubravka won immunity.
: The Red team (Ana, Anči, Lidija, Lucija, Nikola, Orky and Tomislav) lost the weekly task and was automatically nominated. But the members of the team could vote to save one of them. Lidija received the most votes and was saved.

References

External links
 Official Site

2018 Croatian television seasons
Big Brother (Croatian TV series)
Croatia